Preppie is the fifth studio album by American recording R&B artist Cheryl Lynn, released on November 4, 1983, by Columbia Records. The album features the R&B hit singles, "Encore" and "This Time".

Reception

Preppie includes the hit singles "Encore" (#1 R&B hit) and "This Time" (#49 R&B hit). It reached #8 on the R&B albums chart.  The album was primarily produced by Lynn herself, with the exception of "Encore," which was produced by Jimmy Jam and Terry Lewis.

Track listing
"Encore" - 5:20 (Jimmy Jam, Terry Lewis)
"Fix It" 	4:02 (Cheryl Lynn, Andrew Gouche, Michael McGloiry, Thurlene Johnson)	
"Fool A Fool" 	3:50 (Kevin Guillaume, Johnson) 
"This Time" 	4:28 (David Richard Cohen, Johnson)
"Change The Channel" 	3:17 (Vince DiCola, Johnson)
"Preppie" 	4:08 (Lynn, McGloiry)
"Love Rush" 	4:16 (John Barnes, Lynn)
"No One Else Will Do" 	4:49 (Arlesha Devasia, Lorrin Bates, Perry Peyton)
"Free" 	4:40 (Steve Stephens, Lynn)
"Life's Too Short" 	5:07 (Chyase)
 Bonus Tracks (2012 UK Funkytown Grooves Re-issue)
11. "Encore" (12" Dance Mix)  8:18

12. "Free" (Special 12" Version)  7:19

13. "Preppie" (12" Extended Mix) 5:00

14. "Preppie" (12" Club Mix) 5:34

Charts

Singles

External links
 Cheryl Lynn-Preppie at Discogs

References

1983 albums
Cheryl Lynn albums
Columbia Records albums
Albums produced by Jimmy Jam and Terry Lewis